Georgios Koutsis (born 10 September 1973) is a Greek professional football manager and former player.

Career
Born in Athens, Koutsis began playing football as a midfielder for Pannafpliakos F.C. before joining Panelefsiniakos F.C. in 1995. He would play for Aris Thessaloniki F.C. and P.A.O.K. F.C., where he would make over 100 Alpha Ethniki appearances. Koutsis won the 2002–03 Greek Cup with PAOK.

Koutsis retired from playing in the summer of 2011, and was immediately appointed manager of Agrotikos Asteras.

Honours

Club
PAOK
Greek Cup: 2000–01, 2002–03

References

External links
 

Profile at Onsports.gr

1973 births
Living people
Footballers from Athens
Greek footballers
Greece international footballers
Association football midfielders
Super League Greece players
Super League Greece 2 players
Panelefsiniakos F.C. players
Aris Thessaloniki F.C. players
PAOK FC players
Atromitos F.C. players
Chalkidona F.C. players
Agrotikos Asteras F.C. players
Greek football managers
Agrotikos Asteras F.C. managers
Panachaiki F.C. managers
Fokikos F.C. managers
Iraklis Psachna F.C. managers
Olympiacos Volos F.C. managers
Paniliakos F.C. managers
Niki Volos F.C. managers
Panargiakos F.C. managers
Kallithea F.C. managers